Perry Fenwick (born 29 May 1962) is an English actor. He is known for portraying the role of Billy Mitchell in the BBC soap opera EastEnders, a role which he has played since 1998.

Career

Television 
Fenwick's first regular television role was in the sitcom Watching. He has also appeared in Inspector Morse, The Brittas Empire, Minder, On the Up, The Thin Blue Line, and Bergerac. In 1995, Fenwick played a role in the Crimewatch File episode "Sorry Sarah".

He has also appeared in the long-running ITV police drama series The Bill five times, playing a different minor character each time. He appeared in an early episode of Casualty as a minor character in 1986, and appeared in the show again 10 years later in another minor role. In 1998, Fenwick was cast in the role of Billy Mitchell in EastEnders.

Film 
Fenwick's film credits include Party Party, Mona Lisa, Empire State, The Raggedy Rawney, I.D., The Tichborne Claimant, Janice Beard 45 WPM, The Winslow Boy, G:MT – Greenwich Mean Time and ID2: Shadwell Army.

Personal life
Fenwick has one sister, Tracey, and two brothers, Faron and Lee. He is also the second cousin of Georgina Hagen. Fenwick married former Coronation Street actress, Angela Lonsdale, but in February 2010, it was announced that the couple were to separate.

Filmography

Film

Awards and nominations

References

External links 
 
 

English male film actors
English male soap opera actors
Male actors from London
1962 births
Living people
People from Muswell Hill
Alumni of the Sylvia Young Theatre School
20th-century English male actors
21st-century English male actors
People from Canning Town